Pterocyclophora hampsoni is a moth of the family Noctuidae first described by Georg Semper in 1900. It is found on Luzon in the Philippines.

References

Catocalinae
Moths described in 1900